The Church of San Ildefonso (Spanish: Iglesia de San Ildefonso) is a Baroque style church located in the historic center of the city of Toledo, in Castile-La Mancha, Spain. It is also known as the Jesuit church and is consecrated to Saint Ildefonso of Toledo, patron of the city and Father of the Church.

Construction 
Its construction took more than 100 years. Work began in 1629 on lands acquired by the Jesuits of Toledo in 1569. The location hosted the houses of Juan Hurtado de Mendoza Rojas y Guzmán, count of Orgaz. It was the birthplace of Saint Ildefonsus. Pedro and Estefanía Manrique, high Castilian nobility's members, were the promoters of the erection of the temple, as it was written in the founding documents:

Its approach followed the example of the Jesuit churches of Palencia and Alcalá de Henares and that of the Church of the Gesù, in Rome. It is the main church of the Company of Jesus. This trace has been attributed to Jan Bautista Monegro, at that time the master of the Cathedral. Jesuit architect Pedro Sánchez, a Jesuit brother, was in charge of the construction of the temple. Sánchez died in 1633 and was replaced by another companion of his order, Francisco Bautista, who built the facade and reredos in Baroque style. In 1669, Bautista left his place to Bartolomé Zumbigo, native architect of Toledo, who finished the towers and the facade. San Ildefonso was consecrated in 1718, although the sacristy, the main chapel and the octave, which contains the reliquary were incomplete. In 1765, the temple was finally completed under the direction of Jose Hernandez Sierra, architect of Salamanca. Unfortunately for the order of the Jesuits, only two years  after the expulsion from Spain by order of king Charles III of Spain under the charge of instigating the Esquilache Riots, which had taken place in 1766. The Company of Jesus did not recover the church until the twentieth century.

See also
 List of Jesuit sites

References

External links 

Description of Iglesia de San Ildefonso in toledomonumental.com (in Spanish)
Iglesia de San Ildefonso, Turismo de Toledo (in English)

Baroque architecture in Castilla–La Mancha
Roman Catholic churches completed in 1765
Bien de Interés Cultural landmarks in the City of Toledo
Roman Catholic churches in Toledo, Spain
Society of Jesus
18th-century Roman Catholic church buildings in Spain